Marcel Houyoux (2 May 1903 – 28 November 1983) was a Belgian racing cyclist. He won the 1932 edition of the Liège–Bastogne–Liège.

References

External links

1903 births
1983 deaths
Belgian male cyclists
People from Châtelet
Cyclists from Hainaut (province)